Malaya Rivera Drew (born February 6, 1985) is an American stage, film and television actress. Drew is best known for her role as Adele Channing on the cable television series The L Word (2008) and for her role as Katey Alvaro on NBC's long-running ER (2006–2007). She has had recurring roles on Entourage (2005), Las Vegas (2006–2007). American Horror Story (2011), The Originals (2013), Mayans MC (2019) and Good Trouble (2021-2022), as well as notable roles on stage and in film. In film she has appeared in many independent films, as well as playing Gabriella Forester in the 2016 Academy Award nominated Three Billboards Outside Ebbing Missouri. She also narrates the scripted podcast “The Don” for I Heart Radio, currently in its second season.

Early life
Drew was born in Washington, D.C. and attended Woodrow Wilson High School (Washington, D.C.). She has two brothers and her parents are both progressive lawyers. She attended Middlebury College where she studied English Literature and Spanish.  After graduating college, she moved to London and trained at the London Academy of Music and Dramatic Art. She left school a term early when she was cast in the world premiere of Neil LaBute's The Distance From Here directed by David Leveaux at the Almeida Theatre .

Career

She has appeared on television shows including Law and Order: SVU  and CSI: Miami. On CSI she played a character who was originally named Colleen Mitchell but after the producers cast Drew, they changed the character's name to Colleen Mendoza, to reflect Drew's mixed heritage.  She also played Angelica Sandoval on The Inside with Peter Coyote and Rachel Nichols, for the Fox network.

In 2005 she recurred on the HBO series Entourage and from 2006–2007 she starred on the NBC show Las Vegas, playing a new member of the Montecito Casino team with James Lesure, Josh Duhamel and James Caan. While she was still working on Las Vegas, she played new medical student Katey Alvaro on ER. Alvaro is doing her residency in the ER and has an affair with another doctor, played by Shane West. She was on ER during seasons 13 and 14.

In 2008, she played Adele Channing in the fifth season The L Word, a character modeled after Eve Harrington in the movie All About Eve (1950), starring Bette Davis . In 2010 she played Mia Sherman in the pilot True Blue for CBS, which was not picked up to series. In 2011, she recurred as Detective Barrios on American Horror Story opposite Jessica Lange.

In 2013, she was cast as the witch Jane-Anne Deveraux who is considered a martyr by her coven in the CW pilot, The Originals, a spin-off from another CW series, The Vampire Diaries. She first appeared as Jane- Anne on The Vampire Diaries and then continued the role on the series The Originals.    

In 2014, she played Neera in the pilot Galyntine with Peter Fonda, Laura Harrier and Sterling K Brown. The pilot was not picked up to series. 

In 2019 she recurred as Ileana in Mayans MC season 3, having auditioned for the role in both English and Spanish.

In 2021 she was cast on the third season of Good Trouble as Lucia Morales, playing a progressive freshman City Councilmember who is in a love triangle with Malika. She is currently filming season 4. 

Alongside her TV work, she has appeared in many independent films. She played Gabriella Forrester in the Academy Award nominated Three Billboards Outside Ebbing Missouri, for which she was recognized with a SAG Award for Best Ensemble. She also narrates the scripted podcast “The Don” for I Heart Radio. The first season aired in 2021 and I Heart Radio has ordered two more seasons.

Personal life

Drew is married to screenwriter David Kline. They live in Los Angeles.

In the media

In 2008, Drew was voted one of Maxim's "100 Hottest Girls of Entourage" (#19). In 2009, she was voted one of ER's "Hottest Doctors of All Time" (#2).

Filmography

References

External links
 
 Malaya Drew Film Reel on YouTube

Living people
Actresses from Washington, D.C.
Alumni of the London Academy of Music and Dramatic Art
American television actresses
American stage actresses
American film actresses
Middlebury College alumni
American actresses of Filipino descent
1985 births
21st-century American women